The Seguso family has been dedicated to the art of Murano glass in Venice since May 3, 1397.  Seguso is one of the most esteemed, historical and respected glass manufacturers on the island, and among the largest glass furnaces in Murano, which has a few, homonymous furnaces.
Glass made by the Seguso furnace can be found in over 75 museums worldwide, such as MOMA in New York and the Victoria and Albert Museum in London.
Today, Seguso is known for its high end Venetian glass objects, lighting, accessories and custom installations.  Seguso glass has been made for the Pope, Royalty and numerous luxury interiors throughout the world.

Family Tradition
The Seguso family today is able to trace its uninterrupted lineage of glassmakers back over six centuries to 1397, based on documents in the archives of Venice.  In 1605, the family was added to the Libro d’Oro of Murano, or Golden Book of Murano, which included the most important glassmaking families and offered them privileges of nobility. The Seguso glassmakers were especially successful between the mid 16th and 17th centuries when they created an extensive commercial network for their products that reached as far as the newly discovered Americas. During this successful period the Seguso family crest was imprinted on the osella coin of Venice by the Doge in 1792.

However, it was not until the 19th century that they produced their best work and became one of the leading glassmakers on the island of Murano, as well as internationally.  Antonio Seguso  (b.1829) singularly revived forgotten, sophisticated techniques to play a crucial role in the glass renaissance of the mid-19th century, when Murano glassmaking was recovering from its most difficult period of crisis after the fall of the  Venetian Republic.

His son, Giovanni (b. 1853) was an eccentric and equally talented glassmaker, who for a time worked with Paolo Venini. Venini often used to tell visitors, “Nane Patare (nickname of Giovanni Seguso) taught me everything about glass.”

Antonio Seguso (b. 1888), the son of Giovanni, was also a talented glassmaker and along with Napoleone Barovier and Luigi Ferro, founded Artistica Vetreria e Soffieria Barovier, Seguso and Ferro in 1933, this company would eventually become Seguso Vetri d’Arte, employing all five sons of Antonio Seguso in various roles, including Archimede Seguso for a period of time, the father of Giampaolo Seguso, and grandfather to the current generation guiding the Seguso company today, Gianluca, Pierpaolo and Gianandrea Seguso. The brand, trademark, designs and archives of Seguso Vetri d’Arte are today in the hands of the family and sold throughout the world.

Family Lineage

The Brands and Collections of Seguso

Seguso Vetri d’Arte
Seguso Vetri d’Arte founded in 1933, quickly became one of the most important glass furnaces in Murano and the center of creative energy and technical innovation on the island during the mid twentieth century.
After the Seguso Vetri d’Arte brand was sold by the Seguso family in 1974, current Seguso CEO, Gianluca Seguso was able to bring the brand, along with its rich trove of archives back into the hands of the Seguso family in 2007. Today Seguso still manufacturers and sells the iconical and timeless designs of Seguso Vetri d’Arte, under its historical name.

Seguso Interiors
Seguso Interiors is an innovative collection of lighting, furniture, and architectural elements created by Pierpaolo Seguso. The division is dedicated to the decoration and lighting of interiors projects, in a continuous challenge to go beyond the boundaries of production capabilities. Architects and Interior Designers find in Seguso Interiors a reality in which each project is conceived as a tailored suit. 
Its unique furniture design is the result of a patent received by Seguso Creative Director, Pierpaolo Seguso.

Seguso Viro
Seguso Viro is known for its line of contemporary glassware. Started in 1993 with the idea of Giampaolo Seguso for putting the individual at the center (from the Latin vir or mankind) and doing so with the intention of a production based on profound technical research rooted in tradition. Today, glass from the Seguso Viro collections, 101 Limited and Collezioni, is sold by Seguso.

Seguso Experience
Is this an encyclopedia or Italian-style self-loving business advertising? Please edit this text, someone outside of the company.
In 2012 Seguso became one of the first furnaces to open their doors to visitors through a unique program called the Seguso Experience. With the intent to emotionally move the audience, all visitors travel through time; a journey made of real authentic flavors, colors and atmosphere handed down from each Seguso generation to generation. Gianluca and Pierpaolo Seguso's inspiration for this type of visit comes from their desire to raise the bar and deliver a fresh and unique Experience to visitors and show the true soul of Murano, as an alternative way to really feel the Murano glass art and passion, different from the more commercial and touristic influences that exist throughout the island. The Seguso Experience has consistently been rated as one of the top things to do on the island of Murano.

References

Venetian glass
People from Murano
Companies based in Venice
Glassmaking companies of Italy
Glass art
History of glass
1397 establishments in Europe
14th-century establishments in the Republic of Venice
Companies established in the 14th century